Tobias Karlsson may refer to:

 Tobias Karlsson (figure skater), Swedish figure skater
 Tobias Karlsson (songwriter), Swedish songwriter, record producer and entrepreneur
 Tobias Karlsson (handballer)
 Tobias Karlsson (dancer) (born 1977), competitive dancer and choreographer
 Tobias Karlsson (footballer) (born 1989), Swedish footballer

See also
 Tobias Carlsson (born 1975), Swedish footballer